Rafael Fabris de Matos (born 6 January 1996) is a Brazilian professional tennis player.

Matos has a career-high ATP doubles ranking of No. 27 achieved on 14 November 2022. He also has a career high ATP singles ranking of No. 440 achieved on 21 May 2018. He won the mixed doubles at the 2023 Australian Open with compatriot Luisa Stefani, becoming the first Brazilian pair to win a Grand Slam.

Career

2019-2020: ATP debut
Matos made his ATP main draw debut at the 2019 Brasil Open in the doubles draw partnering Igor Marcondes.

At the 2020 Rio Open, Matos alongside Orlando Luz defeated the 2019 Wimbledon and 2019 US Open champions, and ATP doubles World No. 1, Juan Sebastián Cabal and Robert Farah 6–1, 4–6, [10–8].

2021-2022: Major debut & win, First ATP title & top 30 debut
In February 2021, Matos won his first ATP Tour doubles title alongside Felipe Meligeni Alves at the ATP 250 Córdoba Open defeating Romain Arneodo and Benoît Paire. He reached the top 100 in doubles on 3 May 2021 at World No. 99.

He made his Grand Slam debut at the 2021 Wimbledon Championships with compatriot Thiago Monteiro where they reached the second round.

In February 2022, Matos won his second ATP 250 doubles title at the 2022 Chile Open alongside Meligeni Alves. 

In April 2022, Matos won his third ATP 250 doubles title at the 2022 Grand Prix Hassan II alongside spaniard David Vega Hernández. At the 2022 BMW Open he reached his second final with Vega Hernández and fifth overall.

At the 2022 French Open on his debut at this Major, the pair reached the third round with a win over Łukasz Kubot and Édouard Roger-Vasselin but not before defeating 13th seeded pair of Santiago Gonzalez and Andres Molteni. They reached the quarterfinals where they lost to 12th seeded pair of Marcelo Arevalo and Jean-Julien Rojer. As a result he made his debut in the top 50 in the rankings at world No. 43 on 6 June 2022.

Matos reached the top 30 on 31 October 2022 following a fifth title for the season at the 2022 Sofia Open and a final showing at the ATP 500 2022 Rakuten Japan Open Tennis Championships with Vega Hernández. He ended 2022 with 6 ATP titles already obtained in his career, and having reached the rank of n.27 in the world in November.

2023: Historic Major mixed doubles title
Playing in mixed doubles of the 2023 Australian Open with fellow Brazilian Luisa Stefani, they won the first Grand Slam title for Brazil, an unprecedented feat both as a 100% Brazilian duo and individually.

Significant finals

Grand Slam finals

Mixed doubles: 1 (title)

ATP career finals

Doubles: 9 (6 titles, 3 runner-ups)

Challenger and Futures finals

Singles: 9 (4–5)

Doubles: 20 (11–8)

National representation

Davis Cup

Matos was first nominated to play for Brazil in Davis Cup in September 2021 against Lebanon in doubles. Matos alongside Marcelo Demoliner made his debut in Davis Cup against Benjamin Hassan and Habib Hady and won in three sets at the third rubber of that tie. Later, the Brazilian team confirmed the 4-0 tie and advanced into the 2022 Davis Cup Qualifying Round. 
Currently, Matos sports a 3–0 record in Davis Cup matches. He has played only doubles matches thus far.

Junior Grand Slam finals

Doubles: 1 (1 runner-up)

References

External links
 
 

1996 births
Living people
Brazilian male tennis players
Sportspeople from Porto Alegre